The Magaguadavic River is an historic Canadian river located in the province of New Brunswick.

The name "Magaguadavic" is a Maliseet / Passamaquoddy term that is believed to translate into "River of Eels".

Description
It rises as an outlet of Magaguadavic Lake in York County, flowing south through a low coastal mountain range called the St. Croix Highlands before emptying into Passamaquoddy Bay, a sub-basin of the Bay of Fundy.

One of the tributaries drains Lake Utopia into the river and is formally named "The Canal".  Occasionally if water levels in the river are high enough, the Magaguadavic will drain into Lake Utopia through The Canal first, before eventually reversing course to drain back through The Canal and discharging into Passamaquoddy Bay.

Communities
The river passes through the following communities from north to south:

York County
 Thomaston Corner
 Upper Brockway
 Brockway

Charlotte County
 Flume Ridge
 Pomeroy-Piskahegan
 Lee Settlement
 Second Falls
 Bonny River
 St. George
 Caithness *
 Mascarene *

* denotes estuary portion

Crossings
There are several bridges and one dam crossing the Magaguadavic River, from north to south:

This bridge was originally constructed for the European and North American Railway and was later operated by the New Brunswick Railway and the Canadian Pacific Railway before being purchased by NBSR.
 An unnamed highway bridge carrying Route 3 across the river at Thomaston Corner.
 An unnamed highway bridge carrying Tweedside Rd across the river at Brockway.
 "Magaguadavic River No. 7" is the name for a  covered bridge carrying Mill Rd across the river at Flume Ridge.  It was built in 1905 and is a Burr Truss design.
 "Pomeroy Bridge" is the name of the highway bridge carrying Piskahegan Rd across the river at Piskahegan.
 An unnamed highway bridge carrying Red Rock Rd across the river at Second Falls.
 An unnamed highway bridge carrying Route 770 across the river at Canal. This bridge is locally known as the "Sheldon Lee Bridge" after local former provincial Liberal MLA, Sheldon Lee. The bridge was built during a period when Lee served as Minister of Transportation for New Brunswick.
 A dismantled unnamed railway bridge that once carried the Grand Southern Railway and was later operated by the Canadian Pacific Railway before being abandoned in 1988. Only foundations of the former bridge remain today.
 Two unnamed highway bridges carrying the westbound and eastbound lanes of the Route 1 expressway across the river at St. George.
 "Upper Bridge" in the town of St. George, carrying Brunswick Street across the river.
 The St. George Hydroelectric Station, owned by Saint George Pulp and Power which is a subsidiary of J.D. Irving Limited, has a dam across the river at St. George immediately upstream of a steep gorge into which the river plunges to sea level.
 "Lower Bridge" in the town of St. George, carrying South Street across the river.

The Canal is crossed by a single bridge:

 "Canal Bridge" is the name for a  covered bridge carrying Canal Road across The Canal at Canal.  It was built in 1917 and is a Howe truss design.

Further reading
 C. L. Craig, The Young Emigrants: Craigs of the Magaguadavie: a story of the 84th Regiment, Royal Highland Emigrants, Craig family history and the settlement of the Magaguadavic River area of New Brunswick, self-published?, 1985.

See also
List of rivers of New Brunswick

External links
St. George, New Brunswick
St. George Power Dam

References

Rivers of New Brunswick